The following is a list of episodes of the American talk show web series Larry King Now hosted by Larry King. The series is available on Ora TV, Hulu and RT.

Season 1

Season 2

Season 3

Lists of web series episodes